The Journal of Basic Microbiology is a bimonthly peer-reviewed scientific journal focusing on microbiology. It was established in 1960 as the Zeitschrift für allgemeine Mikrobiologie and obtained its current title in 1985.

According to the Journal Citation Reports, the journal has a 2020 impact factor of 2.281, ranking it 111th out of 137 journals in the category "Microbiology".

References

External links 
 

English-language journals
Wiley-VCH academic journals
Microbiology journals
Bimonthly journals
Publications established in 1960